William Thomas Francis Dodd (8 March 1908 – 13 February 1993) was an English first-class cricketer. Dodd was a left-handed batsman who bowled slow left-arm orthodox.

Dodd made his first-class debut for Hampshire against Yorkshire in the 1931 County Championship. Dodd represented Hampshire in ten first-class matches from 1931 to 1935. Dodd's final appearance for the county came against Glamorgan. Dodd took ten wickets for Hampshire at a bowling average of 32.10, with one five wicket haul against Middlesex in 1935, which yielded his best bowling figures of 5/63.

Dodd died at the New Forest, Hampshire on 13 February 1993.

External links
William Dodd at Cricinfo
William Dodd at CricketArchive
Matches and detailed statistics for William Dodd

1908 births
1993 deaths
People from Steep, Hampshire
English cricketers
Hampshire cricketers